Eleven is a British television production company founded by Jamie Campbell and Joel Wilson. It was formed in 2006 and was the first drama production company to benefit from the Channel 4 Growth Fund, set up to nurture independent creative companies based in the UK. 

Eleven produces scripted and non-scripted content for the UK and international markets.

History 
Eleven was founded in 2006 by Jamie Campbell and Joel Wilson, named so due to the initial number of projects being undertaken by the pair.

The Channel 4 Growth Fund took a minority stake in Eleven in 2014, making it the first drama production company to benefit from their £20m fund.

Previous significant output includes the critically acclaimed, multi-award nominated series Glue, an eight-part mystery drama for E4 written by multi-BAFTA winner Jack Thorne, starring Yasmin Paige, Billy Howle, Callum Turner, Charlotte Spencer, and Jordan Stephens; Gap Year, a comedy drama written by Tom Basden and the first UK TV scripted series to film in China for E4; BAFTA-Nominated The Enfield Haunting, a drama series starring Timothy Spall, Juliet Stevenson and Matthew Macfadyen for Sky Living; and BAFTA-nominated Cast Offs for Channel 4.

The company's most successful project to date is Sex Education, an eight-part comedy drama series for Netflix released in 2019 and created by Laurie Nunn. The series received critical acclaim for its ensemble cast, writing, directing, production values, and mature treatment of its themes, with over 40 million viewers streaming the first series after its debut. The series has won two BAFTA TV Awards and the third series won Best Comedy at the 50th International Emmy Awards. Production for the fourth season of Sex Education was confirmed to be underway in August 2022.

In August 2019, BBC Three commissioned Red Rose, an eight part horror series created by The Clarkson Twins, which was released on BBC iPlayer on August 15th 2022.

In February 2020, it was announced that Netflix had commissioned a 10-part political drama named White Stork to be produced by Eleven. The series' cast was due to feature Tom Hiddleston as lead, with Claire Foy also rumoured to have been offered a role. Production was halted in the wake of the COVID-19 pandemic, which caused scheduling conflicts for Hiddleston.

In April 2020, Sony Pictures Television acquired a significant stake in Eleven Film, including Channel 4's stake.

In May 2022, the BBC and STAN commissioned a new series titled Ten Pound Poms, a drama about the British citizens who migrated to Australia after the Second World War, with filming commencing in Australia shortly after.

Eleven's most recently commissioned series, I.D., was announced by Channel 4 in August 2022. The eight-part mystery thriller, which centres around a young deaf woman, was created by Genevieve Barr.

In September 2022, it was announced that Eleven was co-developing a series adaptation of M.L. Rio's thriller novel, If We Were Villains, with Canadian production company Blink49 Studios.

Productions

Drama / Comedy 
 I.D. (expected 2024) for Channel 4
 Ten Pound Poms (2023) for BBC One
 Red Rose (2022) for BBC Three
 Sex Education (2019–present) for Netflix
 True Horror (2018) for Channel 4
 Gap Year (2016) for E4 
 The Enfield Haunting (2015) for Sky Living
 Rotters (2015) for Sky Arts
 Glue (2014) for E4
 Mr Understood (2013) for Sky Arts
 Rick and Peter (2010) for Channel 4
 Cast Offs (2009) for Channel 4
 Bitter (2008) Short

Documentary 
 The Secret Life of the Pub (2015) for Channel 4
 My Breasts Could Kill Me (2009) for Sky One
 The Murder of Billie-Jo (2008) for Channel 4
 Being Maxine Carr (2007) for Channel 4
 Getting to Gordon (2007) for BBC Newsnight
 Make Me A Virgin (2007) for Channel 4
 Cyberskiving (2007) for Channel 4
 Candid Cameron (2006) for BBC Newsnight

References

External links 
 

Mass media companies established in 2006
Mass media companies based in London
Sony Pictures Entertainment
Sony Pictures Television
Sony Pictures Television production companies
2006 establishments in England
British companies established in 2006
Television production companies of the United Kingdom
2020 mergers and acquisitions
British subsidiaries of foreign companies